Lynn Brock (1877-1943) was the pseudonym of the Irish writer Alister McAllister, who moved to England and wrote a series of mystery novels. Brock is best known for his series of Colonel Gore detective novels, which enjoyed popularity in the 1920s and 1930s during the Golden Age of Detective Fiction. His novels employ a complexity of style and are generally set in rural locations. He also wrote several plays under the name Anthony Wharton.

He was educated at the National University of Ireland, where he served as chief clerk between 1908 and 1914. During the First World War he served with the British Army in the Machine Gun Corps.

Main works

Colonel Gore
 The Deductions of Colonel Gore (1924)
 Colonel Gore’s Second Case (1925)
 The Kink (1927)
 The Slip-Carriage Mystery (1928)
 The Mendip Mystery (1929)
 Q.E.D.  (1930)
 The Stoat (1940)

Other
 The Two Of Diamonds (1926)
 The Dagwort Coombe Murder (1929)
 Nightmare (1932)
 The Silver Sickle Case (1938)
 Fourfingers (1939)
 The Riddle of the Roost (1939)

References

Bibliography
 Keating, Henry Reymond Fitzwalter. Whodunit?: A Guide to Crime, Suspense, and Spy Fiction. Van Nostrand Reinhold Company, 1982.
 Reilly, John M. Twentieth Century Crime & Mystery Writers. Springer, 2015.

1877 births
1943 deaths
British writers
Irish writers
Writers from Dublin (city)